Rhytiphora dentipes is a species of beetle in the family Cerambycidae. It was described by Thomas Blackburn in 1894. It is known from Australia.

References

dentipes
Beetles described in 1894
Taxa named by Thomas Blackburn (entomologist)